is a passenger railway station located in the town of Masaki, Iyo District, Ehime Prefecture, Japan. It is operated by JR Shikoku and has the station number "U02".

Lines
Only Yosan Line local trains stop at the station and these ply the sectors  -  via  or  -  via the Uchiko branch. Connections with other services are needed to travel further east of Matsuyama.

Layout
The station consists of two staggered opposed side platforms serving two tracks. Line 1, served by platform 1 on the side of the station building, is a through track while line 2 is a passing loop. The station building is unstaffed and houses a waiting room and an automatic ticket vending machine. Access to platform 2 is by means of a footbridge. Two sidings branch off line 1 and end near the station building.

History
At that time the station was operated by Japanese Government Railways, later becoming Japanese National Railways (JNR). With the privatization of JNR on 1 April 1987, control of the station passed to JR Shikoku.

Surrounding area
 Masaki Municipal Kita-Iyo Elementary School
 Masaki Municipal Kita-Iyo Junior High School

See also
 List of railway stations in Japan

References

External links
 Station timetable

Railway stations in Ehime Prefecture
Railway stations in Japan opened in 1930
Masaki, Ehime